Kuggar is a hamlet in the parish of Grade-Ruan in Cornwall, England.
Kuggar, within the Cornwall Area of Outstanding Natural Beauty (AONB), lies off the A3083 road, between the villages of St Ruan and Gwendreath.

Landmarks
The area is dominated by holiday parks, particularly the Sea Acres and Kennack Sands Holiday Parks. There is a surf school and diving centre. The main local pubs/restaurants are "The Potters Bar", which serve pizza and fish and chips and "The Riptide Bar and Grill" which serves steak, and salmon. The Coach House is a B&B dwelling in hamlet. The main road leading through the hamlet leads north to the B3293 road, near Goonhilly Satellite Earth Station.

Wildlife
Rare birds have been spotted on the Sands nearby. Kennack Sands has been described as "one of the cleanest beaches in Britain, with beautifully clear water". In 1918, Allium triquetrum was found by a stream in the vicinity. In the summer months, Basking sharks and Pinnipeds have been spotted off the coast nearby.

References

Hamlets in Cornwall
Lizard Peninsula